Tony Karon is a South African-born journalist and former anti-Apartheid activist. He is currently Al Jazeera America's senior online executive producer.  He was formerly the Senior Editor at Time.com.

He is originally from Cape Town, South Africa, and has been living in New York City since 1993. He studied at the University of Cape Town, and in the 1980s, he was a prominent anti-apartheid activist in student movement NUSAS.

He joined TIME Magazine in 1997, and was a Senior Editor for close to 20 years, providing commentary on world affairs. In the past he worked as an activist for the banned African National Congress in South Africa. In April 2013, he was hired as a senior online executive producer of the upcoming Al Jazeera's all-digital video channel, AJ+.

References

External links
Tony Karon home page "Rootless Cosmopolitan"

Living people
Time (magazine) people
Al Jazeera people
American people of South African-Jewish descent
Anti-apartheid activists
South African emigrants to the United States
South African journalists
Year of birth missing (living people)